Walter Trump (born 1952 or 1953 ) is a German mathematician and retired high school teacher. He is known for his work in recreational mathematics.

He has made contributions working on both the square packing problem and the magic tile problem. In 1979 he discovered the optimal known packing of 11 equal squares in a larger square, and in 2003, along with Christian Boyer, developed the first known magic cube of order 5. In 2012, Trump et al. described a model for retention of liquid on random surfaces.
In 2014, he and Francis Gaspalou were able to calculate all 8 × 8 bimagic squares.

Until he retired in 2016, Trump worked as a teacher for mathematics and physics at the Gymnasium in Stein, Bavaria.

References

External links
 Walter Trump's pages on magic series
 Walter Trump's listings on the OEIS
 Walter Trump's solutions for one of Martin Gardner's puzzles 

Scientists from Bavaria
20th-century German mathematicians
Recreational mathematicians
Living people
Year of birth missing (living people)
21st-century German mathematicians
People from Fürth (district)